Jimtown, Illinois may refer to:
Jimtown, Champaign County, Illinois, an unincorporated community in Champaign County, Illinois
Jimtown, Fayette County, Illinois, an unincorporated community in Fayette County, Illinois